Ayamba Atia is a Ghanaian politician and member of the first parliament of the second republic of Ghana representing Zebilla Constituency under the membership of the National Alliance of Liberals (NAL).

Education and early life 
He was born 1940 in Upper Region of Ghana. He attended Government Teacher Training College, Pusiga where he obtained Teachers' Training Certificate. He also attended Government Teacher Training College, Tamale where he obtained Teachers' Training Certificate.

Politics 
He began his political career in 1969 when he became the parliamentary candidate for the National Alliance of Liberals (NAL) to represent Zebilla constituency prior to the commencement of the 1969 Ghanaian parliamentary election. He assumed office as a member of the first parliament of the second republic of Ghana on 1 October 1969 after being pronounced winner at the 1969 Ghanaian parliamentary election and was later suspended following the overthrow of the Busia government on 13 January 1972.

Personal life 
He is a Farmer.

See also 

 Busia government
 List of MPs elected in the 1969 Ghanaian parliamentary election

References 

1940 births
Ghanaian MPs 1969–1972
National Alliance of Liberals politicians
Living people